Sir Rupert Iain Kay Moncreiffe of that Ilk, 11th Baronet  (9 April 1919 – 27 February 1985), Chief of Clan Moncreiffe, was a British Officer of Arms and genealogist.

Biography
Moncreiffe was the son of Lieutenant-Commander Gerald Moncreiffe, RN, and Hilda, daughter of the Comte de Miremont. He succeeded his cousin as 11th Baronet and Chief of Clan Moncreiffe in 1957.

Educated at Stowe School, Heidelberg, and Christ Church, Oxford, as a cadet officer Moncreiffe trained with Derek Bond (actor) and Patrick Leigh Fermor, he later served in Scots Guards during the Second World War, then as attaché at the British embassy in Moscow, before studying Scots Law at the University of Edinburgh. He was awarded a PhD (1958) with a thesis on the Origins and Background of the Law of Succession to Arms and Dignities in Scotland, which was published as a monograph in 2010.

A prominent member of the Lyon Court, Moncreiffe held the offices of Falkland Pursuivant (1952), Kintyre Pursuivant (1953), Unicorn Pursuivant (1955), and (from 1961) Albany Herald. He wrote a popular work about the Scottish clans, The Highland Clans (1967), and with Don Pottinger Simple Heraldry, Cheerfully Illustrated (1953), Simple Custom (1954), and Blood Royal (1956), but his interests also extended to Georgian and Byzantine noble genealogies. Lord of the Dance, A Moncreiffe Miscellany, edited by Hugh Montgomery-Massingberd encompassed his genealogical world-view.

He was elected a Fellow of the American Society of Genealogists in 1969.

He was an incorrigible snob; he even called himself Master Snob. He took silk (relatively late in his career) because very few barristers specialised in heraldic matters and he wished to highlight the importance of this field of speciality. He was a frequent writer of amusing and often illuminating letters to newspapers, particularly The Daily Telegraph, and provided the introduction to Douglas Sutherland's satirical book The English Gentleman (1978). He held membership in many London clubs and founded his own club in Edinburgh, called Puffin's Club, – the name was taken from the nickname of Sir Iain's first wife, 'Puffin', Diana Hay, 23rd Countess of Erroll. It was and continues to be a weekly luncheon club, which between the early 1960s and late 1990s met in Martin's restaurant in Rose Street Lane North, Edinburgh. It still meets monthly in London and Edinburgh.  The membership was and is as varied and eccentric as its founder. Ex-King Zog I, King of Albania paid his founding subscription of £5 in 1961, but died before he could attend. The actor Terence Stamp, Sir Nicholas Fairbairn, Sir Fitzroy Maclean and Lord Dacre all attended with varying frequency. It was said that at some point half the crowned heads of Europe were on the list.

Family
Moncreiffe married twice. Firstly Diana Hay, 23rd Countess of Erroll, whom he married on 19 December 1946 at St Margaret's, Westminster. They had three children:
 Merlin Sereld Victor Gilbert, styled Lord Hay, later 24th Earl of Erroll (b. 20 April 1948).
 Hon. Peregrine David Euan Malcolm Moncreiffe of that Ilk, Chief of Clan Moncreiffe (b. 16 February 1951), married in 1988 Miranda Mary Fox-Pitt (b. 29 December 1968).
 Lady Alexandra Victoria Caroline Anne Moncreiffe Hay (b. Edinburgh, 30 July 1955), married Jolyon Connell (b. Edinburgh, 16 May 1952); they have two daughters, Flora Diana Catharine Cecelia Connell (b. London, 24 February 1990) and Ciara Edith Elisabeth Connell (b. London, 28 March 1994).  Lady Alexandra also has a son, Ivar Francis Grey de Miremont Wigan.

Moncreiffe's first marriage was dissolved in 1964 and in 1966 he took as his second wife Hermione Patricia Faulkner, daughter of Lieutenant-Colonel Walter Douglas Faulkner and Patricia Katherine Montagu Douglas Scott.

Notes

References

Further reading

1919 births
1985 deaths
Baronets in the Baronetage of Nova Scotia
People educated at Stowe School
Commanders of the Royal Victorian Order
20th-century King's Counsel
Scottish officers of arms
Scottish genealogists
Fellows of the American Society of Genealogists
Scottish King's Counsel
Scots Guards officers
British Army personnel of World War II
Alumni of Christ Church, Oxford
Alumni of the University of Edinburgh
20th-century British historians
20th-century British lawyers